DishHome is a DTH service provider in Nepal, operated by Dish Media Network Ltd. It was formed in 2010 after a merger between two DTH providers, namely Home TV and Dish Nepal. In the year of 2011 Sandmartin International Holding (SMT) became one of the key shareholders of Dish Media Network Pvt. Ltd. and provided expertise in developing new technologies and digital innovations in the satellite broadcasting.

By 2016, DishHome had crossed the 750,000 subscriber mark. Dish Home has achieved a customer base of over a million by 2019. 

As of April 2019, DishHome has a total of 200+ television channels, including 150+ SD channels and 50+ HD channels.

DishHome uses MPEG-4 with DVB S2 digital compression technology, transmitting HD Channels and SD Channels in Ku-Band on Amos-4 at 65.0°E. DishHome relies on CAS from Verimatrix and Latens. Their STBs are provisioned by SandMartin and Arion.

In 2021, Dishhome started its own fiber internet under name DishHome Fibernet.

Criticism

In 2022, Dishome showed complete lack of respect to its customers and shut down its call center rather than helping its customers experiencing difficulties to watch FIFA Worldcup 2022.

References

External links
 
 

High-definition television
Direct broadcast satellite services
Telecommunications companies of Nepal
Technology companies established in 2010
2010 establishments in Nepal